Prairie County is a county in the U.S. state of Montana. As of the 2020 census, the population was 1,088, making it the fifth-least populous county in Montana. Its county seat is Terry. Prairie County was created by the Montana Legislature in 1915 out of parts of Custer, Dawson, and Fallon Counties. The name was selected in a contest and reflects the predominant landscape of the region.

The county was the site of the 1938 Custer Creek train wreck that killed 47 people and injured 75.

Geography

Major highways
  Interstate 94
 Montana Highway 253

Adjacent counties

 McCone County - north
 Dawson County - northeast
 Wibaux County - east
 Fallon County - southeast
 Custer County - south
 Garfield County - west

Demographics

2000 census
As of the 2000 census there were 1,199 people, 537 households, and 354 families in the county. The population density was <1/km2 (<1/sq mi). There were 718 housing units at an average density of <1/km2 (<1/sq mi). The racial makeup of the county was 98.00% White, 0.50% Native American, 0.17% Asian, 0.17% from other races, and 1.17% from two or more races. 0.67% of the population were Hispanic or Latino of any race. 43.8% were of German, 12.4% Irish, 11.9% Norwegian and 7.0% English ancestry. 97.8% spoke English and 2.2% German as their first language.

There were 537 households, out of which 22.30% had children under the age of 18 living with them, 61.10% were married couples living together, 2.40% had a female householder with no husband present, and 33.90% were non-families. 31.30% of all households were made up of individuals, and 17.30% had someone living alone who was 65 years of age or older. The average household size was 2.19 and the average family size was 2.74.

The county population contained 18.70% under the age of 18, 4.30% from 18 to 24, 20.00% from 25 to 44, 32.90% from 45 to 64, and 24.10% who were 65 years of age or older. The median age was 49 years. For every 100 females there were 106.70 males. For every 100 females age 18 and over, there were 106.10 males.

The median income for a household in the county was $25,451, and the median income for a family was $32,292. Males had a median income of $22,424 versus $18,833 for females. The per capita income for the county was $14,422. About 13.30% of families and 17.20% of the population were below the poverty line, including 23.60% of those under age 18 and 15.50% of those age 65 or over.

2010 census
As of the 2010 census, there were 1,179 people, 551 households, and 342 families in the county. The racial makeup of the county was 96.4% white, 0.5% Asian, 0.2% American Indian, 0.2% from other races, and 2.8% from two or more races. Those of Hispanic or Latino origin made up 1.4% of the population. In terms of ancestry, 44.7% were German, 18.6% were Norwegian, 14.1% were American, 11.8% were Irish, and 9.5% were English.

Of the 551 households, 18.5% had children under the age of 18 living with them, 55.9% were married couples living together, 4.2% had a female householder with no husband present, 37.9% were non-families, and 34.1% of all households were made up of individuals. The average household size was 2.10 and the average family size was 2.67. The median age was 53.6 years.

The median income for a household in the county was $34,896 and the median income for a family was $43,500. Males had a median income of $28,438 versus $21,964 for females. The per capita income for the county was $21,296. About 12.4% of families and 16.9% of the population were below the poverty line, including 34.6% of those under age 18 and 14.5% of those age 65 or over.

Politics
Voters in Prairie County have voted for Republican Party candidates in all national elections since 1948 (as of 2020).

Communities

Town
 Terry (county seat)

Census-designated place
 Fallon

Other communities

 Crow Rock
 McCloud
 Mildred
 Saugus
 Zero

See also
 List of lakes in Prairie County, Montana
 National Register of Historic Places listings in Prairie County MT

References

External links
 Montana Association of Counties - Prairie County website
 Terry Chamber of Commerce

 
1915 establishments in Montana
Populated places established in 1915